Altwasser may refer to:
Richard Altwasser, a British engineer and inventor, responsible for the hardware design of the ZX Spectrum
Stary Zdrój, a town of Poland